Lincoln County is a county located in the U.S. state of Maine. As of the 2020 census, the population was 35,237. Its seat is Wiscasset. The county was founded in 1760 by the Massachusetts General Court from a portion of York County, Massachusetts and named after the English city Lincoln, the birthplace of Massachusetts Bay Provincial Governor Thomas Pownall.

At its founding, Lincoln County accounted for three-fifths of the state's land, and stretched east to Nova Scotia. Thirteen counties were cut out of this land including Sagadahoc County to the west and a portion of Kennebec County to the north. The county flag is a traditional New England flag, adopted in 1977.

Geography

It is the third-smallest county in Maine by area.

Adjacent counties
Kennebec County — north
Waldo County — northeast
Knox County — east
Sagadahoc County — west

Demographics

2000 census
As of the 2000 census, there were 14,158 households, and 9,542 families living in the county.  The population density was 74 people per square mile (28/km2).  There were 20,849 housing units at an average density of 46 per square mile (18/km2).  The racial makeup of the county was 98.46% White, 0.17% Black or African American, 0.26% Native American, 0.37% Asian, 0.02% Pacific Islander, 0.10% from other races, and 0.61% from two or more races.  0.46% of the population were Hispanic or Latino of any race. 25.3% were of English, 15.4% United States or American, 11.2% Irish, 9.0% German and 7.3% French ancestry. Most of those claiming to be of "American" ancestry are actually of English descent, but have family that has been in the country for so long, in many cases since the early seventeenth century that they choose to identify simply as "American". 97.7% spoke English and 1.0% French as their first language.

There were 14,158 households, out of which 28.20% had children under the age of 18 living with them, 56.10% were married couples living together, 7.70% had a female householder with no husband present, and 32.60% were non-families. 26.70% of all households were made up of individuals, and 12.10% had someone living alone who was 65 years of age or older.  The average household size was 2.35 and the average family size was 2.82.

In the county, the population was spread out, with 22.70% under the age of 18, 5.50% from 18 to 24, 25.60% from 25 to 44, 28.10% from 45 to 64, and 18.20% who were 65 years of age or older.  The median age was 43 years. For every 100 females there were 95.10 males.  For every 100 females age 18 and over, there were 92.00 males.

The median income for a household in the county was $38,686, and the median income for a family was $45,427. Males had a median income of $31,209 versus $23,161 for females. The per capita income for the county was $20,760.  About 6.60% of families and 10.10% of the population were below the poverty line, including 12.80% of those under age 18 and 9.50% of those age 65 or over.

2010 census
As of the 2010 United States census, there were 34,457 people, 15,149 households, and 9,749 families living in the county. The racial makeup of the county was 97.6% white, 0.5% Asian, 0.3% American Indian, 0.3% black or African American, 0.1% from other races, and 1.1% from two or more races. Those of Hispanic or Latino origin made up 0.8% of the population. In terms of ancestry, 30.4% were English, 17.7% were Irish, 13.4% were German, 8.6% were Scottish, and 8.5% were American.

Of the 15,149 households, 24.7% had children under the age of 18 living with them, 51.6% were married couples living together, 8.8% had a female householder with no husband present, 35.6% were non-families, and 28.9% of all households were made up of individuals. The average household size was 2.24 and the average family size was 2.72. The median age was 48.1 years.

The median income for a household in the county was $47,678 and the median income for a family was $58,028. Males had a median income of $40,816 versus $31,473 for females. The per capita income for the county was $28,003. About 7.7% of families and 10.8% of the population were below the poverty line, including 16.2% of those under age 18 and 9.9% of those age 65 or over.

Politics

Voter registration

|}

Communities

Towns

Alna
Boothbay
Boothbay Harbor
Bremen
Bristol
Damariscotta
Dresden
Edgecomb
Jefferson
Newcastle
Nobleboro
Somerville
South Bristol
Southport
Waldoboro
Westport Island
Whitefield
Wiscasset

Plantations 

 Monhegan

Unorganized Territories 

 Hibberts Gore
 Louds Island

Census-designated places
Boothbay Harbor
Damariscotta
Newcastle
Waldoboro
Wiscasset

Transportation
U.S. Route 1 passes through the county in a northeast–southwest fashion. North-south Maine state routes, notably Maine 27, Maine 129, Maine 130 and Maine 32 travel north to the interior of the county and south to the peninsulas by the coast.

Until 1958, the Maine Central Railroad ran passenger trains from Portland, along the Rockland Branch from Brunswick to Rockland to the east, three trains a day on days besides Sunday and fewer trains on Sunday. Stations consisted of Wiscasset, Newcastle, Damariscotta Mills, Nobleboro, Winslow Mills and Waldoboro. In Portland's Union Station, these trains made connections to trains to Boston, New York City, Bangor and the Canadian Maritimes. In the final months, service diminished to one daily except Sunday trip in each direction, until finally discontinuing on April 4, 1959.

From 2003 to 2015, the Maine Eastern Railroad offered seasonal excursion service to Rockland, Maine which connected to Amtrak's Downeaster at Brunswick. In October 2017, the Northern New England Passenger Rail Authority announced plans to extend one weekend Downeaster round trip to Rockland between Memorial Day and Labor Day beginning in 2018. Intermediate stops would be made at Bath, Wiscasset, and Newcastle. As part of preparation, Amtrak, along with the Northern New England Passenger Rail Authority, Maine Department of Transportation and the Central Maine and & Quebec Railroad, made a test run of a train on August 14.

See also
National Register of Historic Places listings in Lincoln County, Maine

References

External links

 Official Website of Lincoln County
 Maine Genealogy: Lincoln County, Maine
 Lincoln County Television, a Public, Educational and Government access television station serving 10 towns in Lincoln County
 Wiscasset Newspaper, serving the Lincoln County Seat and its Route 1 neighbors since 1970
 Boothbay Register, serving Boothbay, Boothbay Harbor, Edgecomb and Southport since 1876

 

 
1760 establishments in Massachusetts
Maine counties
Populated places established in 1760